Kevin Hansen (born 28 May 1998) is a rallycross driver from Sweden. He currently competes in the FIA World Rallycross Championship (WRX) Supercar category, for Team Peugeot-Hansen. His father is the 14-time European Rallycross Champion Kenneth Hansen. He is also the youngest driver to race in a WRX event, making his debut at 17 years and 6 months old.

In 2021, he was a reserve driver for JBXE and substituted for team owner/driver Jenson Button for 2021 Ocean X-Prix.

Racing record

Complete FIA World Rallycross Championship results
(key)

RX Lites Cup

Supercar/RX1/RX1e

|}
† Loss of fifteen championship points – stewards' decision.

Complete FIA European Rallycross Championship results
(key)

JRX Junior Rallycross Cup

Supercar

Complete Global RallyCross Championship results

GRC Lites

Complete Extreme E results

(key)

* Season still in progress.

External links

 

Living people
1998 births
Swedish racing drivers
European Rallycross Championship drivers
World Rallycross Championship drivers
Extreme E drivers
Global RallyCross Championship drivers
Peugeot Sport drivers